Abū ʿAbd Allāh Muḥammad ibn al-Ḥasan ibn Farqad ash-Shaybānī (749/50 – 805), the father of Muslim international law, was an Arab jurist and a disciple  of Abu Hanifa (later being the eponym of the Hanafi school of Islamic jurisprudence), Malik ibn Anas and Abu Yusuf.

Early years
Muḥammad b. al-Ḥasan was born in Wāsiṭ, Iraq, in 750; soon, however, he moved to Kufa, the home town of Abū Ḥanīfa, and grew there. Though he was born to a soldier, he was much more interested in pursuing an intellectual career than a military one. Shaybani began studying in Kufa as a pupil of Abu Hanifa. When al-Shaybani was 18 (in 767), however, Abu Hanifa died after having taught him for only two years.

Shaybani then began training with Abū Yūsuf, his senior, and the leading disciple of Abu Hanifa. He also had other prominent teachers as well: Sufyan al-Thawrī and al-Awzāʿī. he also later visited Medina, and studied for two to three years with Malik b. Anas, founder of the Maliki school of fiqh. Thus, as a result of his education, al-Shaybani became a jurist at a very early age. According to Abu Hanifa's grandson Ismail, he taught in Kufa at age twenty (c. 770 CE).

In Baghdad
Al-Shaybānī moved to Baghdad, where he continued his learning. He was so respected that Caliph Harun al-Rashid appointed him qadi (judge) of his capital city Raqqa (so, after 796 CE). Al-Shaybānī was relieved of this position in 803. He returned to Baghdad and resumed his educational activities. It was during this period he exerted his widest influence. He taught Muhammad ibn Idris ash-Shafi`i, the most prestigious of his pupils. Even later, when ash-Shafi'ī disagreed with his teacher and wrote the Kitāb al-Radd ʿalā Muḥammad b. al-Ḥasan ("Refutation of Muḥammad b. al-Ḥasan [al-Shaybānī]"), he still maintained immense admiration for his teacher.

Al-Rashid re-instated al-Shaybānī in a judicial position. The latter accompanied the caliph to Khorasan, where he served as qadi until his death in 805 at Rey. He died the same day and the same place as the eminent Kufan philologist and grammarian al-Kisāʾī. Thus, al-Rashid remarked that he "buried law and grammar side by side."

Works
His works, known collectively as zahir al-riwaya, were considered authoritative by later Hanafis; they are al-Mabsut, al-Jami al-Kabir, al-Jami al-Saghir, al-Siyar al-Kabir, al-Siyar al-Saghir, and al-Ziyadat.

Al-Shaybani wrote Introduction to the Law of Nations at the end of the 8th century, a book which provided detailed guidelines for the conduct of jihad against unbelievers, as well as guidelines on the treatment of non-Muslim subjects under Muslim rule. Al-Shaybani wrote a second more advanced treatise on the subject, and other jurists soon followed with a number of other multi-volume treatises. They dealt with both public international law as well as private international law.

These early Islamic legal treatises covered the application of Islamic ethics, Islamic economic jurisprudence and Islamic military jurisprudence to international law, and were concerned with a number of modern international law topics, including the law of treaties; the treatment of diplomats, hostages, refugees and prisoners of war; the right of asylum; conduct on the battlefield; protection of women, children and non-combatant civilians; contracts across the lines of battle; the use of poisonous weapons; and devastation of enemy territory. The Umayyad and Abbasid Caliphs were also in continuous diplomatic negotiations with the Byzantine Empire on matters such as peace treaties, the exchange of prisoners of war, and payment of ransoms and tributes.

Al-Shaybani's siyar aims to answers questions like, "when is fighting justified", "who is the target of fighting" and "how is fighting conducted". For Al-Shaybani, a just cause of war was to spread the Islamic empire, either through increasing the territory of the Muslim states, or taking other states as clients. Other just causes included putting down rebellions (Muslim, dhimmi or apostate), punishing brigandry, and ensuring safety of lives and property from violence. Only those who presented a direct military threat were legitimate targets for deadly force. Thus the killing of women, children, old men, disabled, insane was prohibited. Captives in war are distinguished based on combatant status: male captives may be spared or killed, depending on what the commander deems is the best option. Al-Shaybani also explored the use of weapons (such as "hurling machines") which may inadvertently kill noncombatants. He opined it was permissible to use them so long as care was taken to aim at the combatants and effort was made to avoid killing noncombatants. Al-Shaybani's opinions in siyar were influential in the Hanafi school of thought, but diverged from Shafi'i opinions in several matters.

Early Islam scholars

See also
Abu Hanifa
Abu Yusuf
Sharia
List of Islamic scholars described as father or founder of a field

References

Bibliography
 
 Mahmassani, Sobhi. The Philosophy of Jurisprudence in Islam, translated by Farhat J. Ziadeh. Leiden: Brill, 1961.
 Schacht, Joseph. The Origins of Muhammadan Jurisprudence. Oxford: Clarendon Press, 1975.
 
 Bashir, K R. Islamic International Law: Historical Foundations and Al-Shaybani's Siyar, Edward Elgar. Publication Date: 2018

External links
Diagram of teachers and students of Imam Muhammad al-Shaybaani

8th-century births
805 deaths
People from Wasit Governorate
Hanafis
Sunni imams
Sunni Muslim scholars of Islam
8th-century Muslim scholars of Islam
International law scholars
8th-century writers
9th-century writers
Banu Shayban
8th-century jurists
9th-century jurists
8th-century Arabs
8th-century people from the Abbasid Caliphate
Taba‘ at-Tabi‘in hadith narrators